Kanin Howell (born June 20, 1981; Austin, Texas) is an American stunt performer, stunt coordinator, stunt double and actor based in Los Angeles. He is a two-time Screen Actors Guild Awards nominee for his roles in The Unit and CSI: NY.

Early life and career

Early career 
Howell was born on June 20, 1981, in Austin, Texas to stunt performer, Norman Howell. At the age of 5 he made his professional debut, and by the time while he was 8, he performed in Dances With Wolves (1990), and went on to perform in several films throughout his childhood including, Judge Reinhold's Vice Versa (1988), Robert Radler's Best of the Best II (1992), and Kevin Costner's Wyatt Earp (1994).

Career 
Howell has performed stunt-work in numerous works including, Mel Gibson's The Patriot (2000), The Last Castle (2001) with American actor Robert Redford, Murder By Numbers (2002), Jesse Dylan's American Wedding (2003), Victor Salva's Jeepers Creepers 2 (2003), CSI: NY (2004–13) The Unit (2006–07), Hell Ride (2008). New Girl (2011-12), Need for Speed (2014), Agents of S.H.I.E.L.D. (2014–16), Hollows Grove (2014) and Brooklyn Nine-Nine (2014–19).

He has worked as a stunt coordinator on works such as The Call, Scream Queens, Counterpart, CSI: Cyber, Arrested Development, Franklin & Bash and The Client List.

As an actor, he has starred in films such as Need for Speed, Death Sentence, Hell Ride, Priest, Aces 'N' Eights, Mr. Brooks, Secondhand Lions and The Patriot. On television, Howell starred in NBC's Grimm, CBS's The Unit, The Young and the Restless, True Blood, CSI: NY and Criminal Minds.

Howell has been a stunt double for many actors, including, Ewan Mcgregor, Elijah Wood, Skeet Ulrich, Garrett Hedlund, Chris Browning, Michael Eklund, Jason Gerhardt, David Hoflin, Matt Cohen and Seth Adkins.

In 2013, Howell founded Drone 55, a commercial aerial photography firm based in Los Angeles in Los Angeles. He has also been a member of Stunts Unlimited since 2007.

Filmography

Awards and nominations

References

External links 
 Official website
 

Living people
1981 births
American male film actors
American stunt performers
American male television actors
21st-century American male actors
People from Austin, Texas
Stunt doubles